Ilham Tohti (born October 25, 1969) is a Uyghur economist serving a life sentence in China, on separatism-related charges. He is a vocal advocate for the implementation of regional autonomy laws in China, was the host of Uyghur Online, a website founded in 2006 that discusses Uyghur issues, and is known for his research on Uyghur-Han relations. Ilham was summoned from his Beijing home and detained shortly after the July 2009 Ürümqi riots by the authorities because of his criticism of the Chinese government's policies toward Uyghurs in Xinjiang. Ilham was released on August 23 after international pressure and condemnation. He was arrested again in January 2014 and imprisoned after a two-day trial. For his work in the face of adversity he was awarded the PEN/Barbara Goldsmith Freedom to Write Award (2014), the Martin Ennals Award (2016), the Václav Havel Human Rights Prize (2019), and the Sakharov Prize (2019). Ilham is viewed as a moderate and believes that Xinjiang should be granted autonomy according to democratic principles.

Background
Ilham was born in Artush, Xinjiang Uyghur Autonomous Region, China on October 25, 1969, He graduated from the Northeast Normal University and the Economics School at what was then called the Central Nationalities University, now named Minzu University of China (MUC), in Beijing. His profession was economics.

Officials accused him of using his lectures to incite violence, and overthrowing the current government of the People's Republic of China and of participating in separatism activities. According to the limited public information about the trial, the prosecutor claimed that Ilham Tohti mentioned multiple times "do not think [that] violent protests are terrorist activities" during his lectures in the MUC. State media claimed that Ilham Tohti used the "April 23" case to overtly advocate violence and used hate speech during his lectures like "Using violence fights against violence, I admire them as heroes",  "A peaceful person like me may kill and resist". Tohti denied these claims.

In 2006 Ilham founded a website called, Uyghur Online, which published articles in Chinese and Uyghur on social issues. In mid-2008 authorities shut down the website, accusing it of forging links to extremists in the Uyghur diaspora. In a March 2009 interview with Radio Free Asia, Ilham criticized the Chinese government's policy to allow migrant workers into Xinjiang Uyghur Autonomous Region and the phenomenon of young Uyghur women moving to eastern China to find work. In addition, he criticized Xinjiang Uyghur Governor Nur Bekri for "always stress[ing] the stability and security of Xinjiang" instead of "car[ing] about Uyghurs", calling for a stricter interpretation of China's 1984 Regional Ethnic Autonomy Law. That same month, Ilham was detained by authorities, accused of separatism, and interrogated.

China had created in Ilham Tohti "a Uighur Mandela," by jailing him for life in September 2014, as the scholar Wang Lixiong wrote in a Twitter message. The Chinese state-run news agency Xinhua dismissed the comparison claiming that "[w]hile Mandela preached reconciliation, Ilham Tohti preaches hatred and killing."

Detentions
On July 5, 2009 ethnic rioting took place between Uyghurs and Han in Ürümqi, the capital of Xinjiang. The government reported that more than 150 people, mostly Han Chinese, were killed during the clashes. Many Uyghurs claim the governments numbers do not account for the Uyghurs killed by Han vigilantes and security forces. Governor Nur Bekri claimed in a July 6 speech that Uighur Online had spread rumors that contributed to the riots. Officials avoided discussion of issues such as the limits on Uyghur religious practice, the asymmetry of economic opportunities for Han and Uyghurs, the suppression of the Uyghur language, or the increasing Han immigration in a Uyghur majority province.

On July 8, 2009, Radio Free Asia reported that Ilham's whereabouts were unknown after he had been summoned from his home in Beijing. The Chinese dissident Wang Lixiong and his Tibetan activist wife Woeser started an on-line petition calling for Ilham's release, which was signed by other dissidents including Ran Yunfei. PEN American Center, Amnesty International, and Reporters Without Borders also issued appeals or statements of concern.

Ilham was released from detention on August 23, along with two other Chinese dissidents, Xu Zhiyong and Zhuang Lu, after pressure on Beijing from the administration of American President Barack Obama. Ilham said that during his detention, he was confined to his home and a hotel with several police officers who did not treat him inhumanely. He stated that after his release, they warned him against criticism of the government's handling of riots, and prevented him and his family from leaving Beijing.

Chinese authorities arrested and detained Ilham again in January 2014, and removed computers from his home. He was held at a detention center in Xinjiang Uyghur Autonomous Region.

On April 1, 2014, Ilham was awarded the PEN/Barbara Goldsmith Freedom to Write Award, an American human rights award given to writers anywhere in the world who fight for freedom of expression. According to the statement from PEN, Ilham, was "long harassed by Chinese authorities for his outspoken views on the rights of China's Muslim Uyghur minority. Ilham represents a new generation of endangered writers who use the web and social media to fight oppression and broadcast to concerned parties around the globe. We hope this honor helps awaken Chinese authorities to the injustice being perpetrated and galvanizes the worldwide campaign to demand Ilham's freedom." China's foreign ministry expressed anger at the award, saying that he was a suspected criminal.

After a two-day hearing before the Ürümqi People's Intermediate Court in September 2014, Ilham was found guilty of "separatism", sentenced him to life imprisonment and ordered all of Ilham's assets seized. Amnesty International asserted Ilham's legal team were never shown evidence and furthermore denied access to their client for six months, and condemned the trial as an "affront to justice". His imprisonment is criticized by a number of human rights organizations around the globe; such as Electronic Frontier Foundation.

On September 24, 2014, United States Secretary of State John Kerry criticized what he called a 'harsh' sentence, and called for Ilham's release.

In 2021 China denied the request of a group of Ambassadors from European Union countries to visit Ilham Tohti with Chinese authorities citing his convicted status as the reason they could not meet with him.

On 31 March 2022, the Human Rights Watch reported that the Chinese government have arbitrarily detained the students of Ilham Tohti. A leaked government list of prisoners indicated that six of the seven students on the list were sentenced in December 2014 to between three-and-a-half and eight years in prison. Previous reports have revealed that individuals who were supposed to be released from prison were sent soon after release or immediately to political education camps or prisons instead.

Awards and recognition

In September 2016 he was nominated for the Sakharov Prize for Freedom of Thought, and the following month he was declared as the winner of the Martin Ennals Award for Human Rights Defenders. The Martin Ennals foundation cited Ilham for spending two decades trying "to foster dialogue and understanding" between the Han Chinese majority and members of Xinjiang's largely Muslim Uyghurs. “He has rejected separatism and violence, and sought reconciliation based on a respect for Uighur culture, which has been subject to religious, cultural and political repression,” they added.

In September 2019 the Council of Europe jointly awarded the 2019 Václav Havel Human Rights Prize to Ilham Tohti and the Youth Initiative for Human Rights. Enver Can of the Ilham Tohti Initiative received the prize on his behalf.

In October 2019 Ilham Tohti was awarded the 2019 Sakharov Prize for Freedom of Thought by the European Parliament.

In December 2019 Tohti's daughter, Jewher Ilham, accepted the Sakharov Prize and €50,000 on his behalf.

He was featured in the 2021 edition of The Muslim 500: The World’s 500 Most Influential Muslims which named him Man of the Year.

References

External links

Tohti's original Uighur Online website at archive.org 
Ilham Tohti's Uighur Online website  hosted on googledocs
Profile from Herald Sun, January 3, 2010
Profile from The New York Times, August 21, 2010

1969 births
People's Republic of China economists
Uyghur activists
Chinese human rights activists
Chinese prisoners and detainees
Living people
People from Kizilsu
Minzu University of China alumni
Northeast Normal University alumni
Economists from Xinjiang
Writers from Xinjiang
Educators from Xinjiang
Sakharov Prize laureates